Glipa kurosawai is a species of beetle in the genus Glipa. It was described in 1985.

References

kurosawai
Beetles described in 1985